Abdur Rashid was a member of the 3rd National Assembly of Pakistan representing Jessore-III.

See also
Politics of Pakistan

References

living people
Pakistani MNAs 1962–1965
Place of birth missing (living people)
Year of birth missing (living people)